Ricardo Edgar Castillo (born 7 June 1979) is a Mexican professional boxer NABF Featherweight Champion. Ricardo is the younger brother of former world champion, José Luis Castillo.

Professional career
On 19 December 2009, Carrillo fought to a draw against IBF Featherweight champion Cristobal Cruz at the Palenque de Gallos in Tuxtla Gutiérrez, Chiapas, Mexico.

See also

Notable boxing families

References

External links

Boxers from Sonora
People from Empalme, Sonora
Featherweight boxers
1979 births
Living people
Mexican male boxers